In electric power transmission, wheeling is the transportation of electric energy (megawatt-hours) from within an electrical grid to an electrical load outside the grid boundaries.  In a simpler sense, it refers to the process of transmission of electricity through the transmission lines. 

Two types of wheeling are 1) a wheel-through, where the electrical power generation and the load are both outside the boundaries of the transmission system and 2) a wheel-out, where the generation resource is inside the boundaries of the transmission system but the load is outside. Wheeling often refers to the scheduling of the energy transfer from one balancing authority (cf. Balancing Authority, Tie Facility and Interconnection) to another. Since the wheeling of electric energy requires use of a transmission system, there is often an associated fee which goes to the transmission owners.

Transmission ownership
Under deregulation, many vertically integrated utilities were separated into generation owners, transmission and distribution owners, and retail providers. To recover capital costs, operating costs and earn a return on investment, a transmission revenue requirement (TRR) is established and approved by a national agency (such as the Federal Energy Regulatory Commission in the United States) for each transmission owner. The TRR is paid through transmission access charges (TACs), load-weighted fees charged to internal load and energy exports for use of the transmission facilities. The energy export fee is often referred to as a wheeling charge. When wheeling-through, the transmission access charge only applies to the exported amount.

Wheeling charge
A wheeling charge is a currency per megawatt-hour amount that a transmission owner receives for the use of its system to export energy. The total amount due in TAC fees is determined by the following equation:

Where 'Wc' is wheeling charge per unit. 'Pw' is the power in MW. 

The fee associated with wheeling is referred to as a "wheeling charge." This is an amount in $/MWh which transmission owner recovers for the use of its system. If the resource entity must go through multiple [transmission owner]s, it may be charged a wheeling charge for each one. There are many reasons for a wheeling charge. It may be to recover some costs of transmission facilities or congestion. Another motivation would be to keep prices low. For instance, if the electricity prices in Arizona are 30 $/MWh and prices in California are 50 $/MWh, resources in Arizona would want to sell to the California market to make more money. The utilities in Arizona would then be forced to pay 50 $/MWh if they needed these resources. If Arizona charged a wheeling charge of 10 $/MWh, Arizona would only have to pay 40 $/MWh to compete with California. However, Arizona would not want to charge too much, as this could impact the advantages of trading electric energy between systems. In this way, it works similarly to tariffs.

In Tamilnadu, wheeling charges are applicable for the consumer who uses third party power. They charge ₹ 0.2105 Rupees per MW.
In Assam, wheeling charges are applicable for the consumer who uses third party power. They charge ₹ 0.26 Rupees per MW

See also 
 Power outage
 V2G

References

Electric power transmission